Off the Grid: Million Dollar Manhunt is a game show that airs on The History Channel. Contestants attempt to evade Kevin Reeve, an expert in surveillance, fugitive tracking, and classified government technologies. If they can succeed in performing simple tasks, for one day, and avoid detection, they win $1 million.

References

External links

History (American TV channel) original programming
2010s American game shows
2011 American television series debuts
2011 American television series endings
Surveillance